In mathematical optimization, the revised simplex method is a variant of George Dantzig's simplex method for linear programming.

The revised simplex method is mathematically equivalent to the standard simplex method but differs in implementation. Instead of maintaining a tableau which explicitly represents the constraints adjusted to a set of basic variables, it maintains a representation of a basis of the matrix representing the constraints. The matrix-oriented approach allows for greater computational efficiency by enabling sparse matrix operations.

Problem formulation
For the rest of the discussion, it is assumed that a linear programming problem has been converted into the following standard form:

where . Without loss of generality, it is assumed that the constraint matrix  has full row rank and that the problem is feasible, i.e., there is at least one  such that . If  is rank-deficient, either there are redundant constraints, or the problem is infeasible. Both situations can be handled by a presolve step.

Algorithmic description

Optimality conditions
For linear programming, the Karush–Kuhn–Tucker conditions are both necessary and sufficient for optimality. The KKT conditions of a linear programming problem in the standard form is

By what is sometimes known as the fundamental theorem of linear programming,  a vertex  of the feasible polytope can be identified by being a basis  of  chosen from the latter's columns. Since  has full rank,  is nonsingular. Without loss of generality, assume that . Then  is given by

where . Partition  and  accordingly into

To satisfy the complementary slackness condition, let . It follows that

which implies that

If  at this point, the KKT conditions are satisfied, and thus  is optimal.

Pivot operation
Therefore, if the problem is bounded, the revised simplex method must terminate at an optimal vertex after repeated pivot operations because there are only a finite number of vertices.

Select an index  such that  as the entering index. It can be shown that

Since

Let . If , no matter how much  is increased,  will stay nonnegative. Hence,  can be arbitrarily decreased, and thus the problem is unbounded. Otherwise, select an index  as the leaving index. This choice effectively increases  from zero until  is reduced to zero while maintaining feasibility.

Numerical example

Consider a linear program where

Let

initially, which corresponds to a feasible vertex . At this moment,

Choose  as the entering index.

After the pivot operation,

Correspondingly,

A positive  indicates that  is now optimal.

Practical issues

Degeneracy

A perturbation or lexicographic strategy can be used to prevent cycling and guarantee termination.

Basis representation
Two types of linear systems involving  are present in the revised simplex method:

Instead of refactorizing , usually an LU factorization is directly updated after each pivot operation, for which purpose there exist several strategies such as the Forrest−Tomlin and Bartels−Golub methods. However, the amount of data representing the updates as well as numerical errors builds up over time and makes periodic refactorization necessary.

Notes and references

Notes

References

Bibliography

 
 

Exchange algorithms
Linear programming